The Valenzuela People's Park, officially the Valenzuela City People's Park and also known to local residents as simply People's Park or VCPP, is an urban community park located in the city of Valenzuela, Philippines. It is built beside the Valenzuela City Government Center and the Valenzuela Town Center. The construction of the  park was started in 2014 and was formally opened to the public on February 14, 2015, during the 17th Valenzuela City Charter Day.

Location
People's Park is bounded by two major roads of the city, MacArthur Highway and A. Pablo Street. The park itself is surrounded by various landmarks, government buildings, and shopping centers. The South Supermarket (in front of the People's Park) and the Valenzuela Town Center (between the People's Park and the New City Hall) are the nearest shopping destinations for park visitors. The park is also located beside the Valenzuela City Government Center.

Gallery

References

See also
 People's Park (disambiguation)

Parks in Metro Manila
Buildings and structures in Valenzuela, Metro Manila